José Dámaso Rodríguez y Rodríguez (11 December 1824 – 20 April 1862), known as Pepete, was a Spanish bullfighter in the mid-19th century. He was the first notable matador known by this nickname.

Biography 
José Dámaso Rodríguez y Rodríguez was born in 1824 in the La Merced neighborhood of Córdoba, Spain. He joined the family business, the livestock trade, and was married very young to Rafaela Bejarano, who came from a family of bullfighters.

He took the alternativa on 12 August 1850 in Seville, although some historians disagree as to the exact date and location of his alternativa.

Pepete was considered a valiant bullfighter who thrilled the public, as passionate about the bullring as he was about money. It is said that on one occasion, having sustained a chest injury from getting very close to the bull, he later showed his lesions to his friends and said: "... I cure this kind of thing myself with this meicina" — the gold coin he received as his pay. In the 1850s, he toured the most important bullrings across Spain, receiving both fans' recognition and multiple injuries.

However, the bull struck Pepete in the heart. The matador calmly got up and walked toward the edge of the ring, where he fell dead.

References 

1824 births
1862 deaths
Spanish bullfighters
Footballers from Córdoba, Spain
Bullfighters killed in the arena
Sport deaths in Spain